Star is the debut studio album by American alternative rock band Belly, released on January 25, 1993.

Composition
Along with alternative rock and jangle pop, the songs on Star also dig into "haunting", "avant" folk rock. Tanya Donelly was credited with pushing dream pop's boundaries by "trimming away its pretensions" while keeping its "trancy harmonies". A "distinct post-punk quality" has also been seen in the music, alongside some country and Spaghetti Western influences.

Release
Star was released on January 25, 1993 and was an unexpected success. On February 21, 1994, the album was certified Gold by the Recording Industry Association of America for sales of at least 500,000 units.

The single "Feed the Tree" became a number one hit on the Billboard Modern Rock Tracks chart, as well as a surprise pop hit, peaking at number 95 on the Billboard Hot 100 singles chart in the late spring of 1993. The music video for "Feed the Tree" was a smash buzz bin MTV hit, and was nominated for Best Alternative Video VMA and Best New Artist VMA in 1993. "Slow Dog" peaked at number 17 on the Modern Rock Tracks chart in the summer of 1993, while "Gepetto" peaked at number 8 in the late fall/winter of 1993, as well as charting on the Billboard Bubbling Under the Hot 100 chart for five weeks in the late fall/winter of 1993.

"Angel" is not a rerecording of the song of the same name that Tanya Donelly wrote with Throwing Muses for their 1989 album Hunkpapa.

Reception

In 1994, Star was nominated for a Grammy Award for Best Alternative Album, while Belly were nominated for Best New Artist.

Track listing

Personnel
Adapted from AllMusic's Credits page for Star. 

Belly
 Tanya Donelly – vocals, guitar
 Fred Abong – bass
 Chris Gorman – drums, percussion 
 Thomas Gorman – guitar, organ

Additional musicians
 Chick Graining – guitar, slide guitar, vocals 

Technical 
 Belly – production 
 Tracy Chisholm – engineering, production 
 Gil Norton – production 

Artwork and design
 Chris Bigg – design
 Chris Gorman – photography

Charts

Certifications

References

1993 debut albums
Belly (band) albums
Albums produced by Gil Norton
Sire Records albums
Reprise Records albums
Avant-pop albums